Laura Ashley (née Mountney; 7 September 1925 – 17 September 1985) was a Welsh fashion designer and businesswoman. She originally made furnishing materials in the 1950s, expanding the business into clothing design and manufacture in the 1960s. The Laura Ashley style is characterised by Romantic designs – often with a 19th-century rural feel – and the use of natural fabrics.

Early life
Ashley was born at her grandmother's home, 31 Station Terrace, Dowlais, Merthyr Tydfil, Wales. She was raised in a civil service family as a Strict Baptist. The chapel she attended in Dowlais (Hebron) was Welsh language and although she could not understand it, she loved it, especially the singing. Educated at Marshall's School in Merthyr Tydfil until 1932, she was then sent to the Elmwood School, Croydon. She was evacuated back to Wales aged 13, but with so many World War II evacuees there were no school places left and she attended Aberdare Secretarial School.

In 1942, at age 16, she left school and served in the Women's Royal Naval Service. During this period she met engineer Bernard Ashley at a youth club in Wallington. After the war, Bernard was posted to India with the Gurkhas, and the pair corresponded by letter. From 1945 to 1952, she worked as a secretary for the National Federation of Women's Institutes in London, marrying Bernard in 1949.

The company

While working as a secretary and raising her first two children, Ashley undertook some development work for the Women's Institute on quilting. Revisiting the craft she had learnt with her grandmother, she began designing headscarves, napkins, table mats and tea-towels which Bernard printed on a machine he had designed in their attic flat at 83 Cambridge Street, Pimlico, London.

The couple had invested £10 in wood for the screen frame, dyes and a few yards of linen. Ashley's inspiration to start producing printed fabric came from a Women's Institute display of traditional handicrafts at the Victoria & Albert Museum. When Ashley looked for small patches carrying Victorian designs to help her make patchworks, she found no such thing existed. Here was an opportunity, and she started to print Victorian style headscarves in 1953.

The scarves quickly became successful – retailing both via mail order and at high street chains such as John Lewis – and Bernard left his City job to print fabrics full-time. The company was originally registered as Ashley Mountney (Laura's maiden name), but Bernard changed the name to Laura Ashley because he felt a woman's name was more appropriate for the type of products they were producing. The new company moved to Kent in 1955, but when the third of their four children was born, the family moved to Wales in 1960.

Laura Ashley's first shop was opened at 35 Maengwyn Street, Machynlleth, Montgomeryshire, in 1961. The Laura Ashley association is commemorated by a small plaque. The shop sold locally produced honey and walking sticks as well as the couple's own products. Here Laura worked with a seamstress to introduce their first forays into fashion, producing smock like shirts and gardening smocks. The family lived above the shop until moving to Carno, Montgomeryshire. They first set up in the vacant social club, but moved in 1967 to the local railway station, which had been closed two years earlier.

Personal life
Laura and Bernard Ashley had four children who were all involved with the business. David (born 1954/55), the eldest son, designed the shops; one of the daughters, Jane, was the company photographer; another daughter, Emma, and their second son, Nick, were part of the company's fashion design team. Bernard was the company chairman and Laura kept a close eye on fabrics. The success of the business meant that the Ashleys could afford a yacht, a private plane, the French Château de Remaisnil in Picardy, Rhydoldog House, a mansion near Rhaeadr, Powys, Wales, a town-house in Brussels, and the villa Contenta in Lyford Cay, New Providence, Bahamas.

Death
In 1985, just after her 60th birthday, Laura Ashley fell down the stairs of her daughter's home in the West Midlands and was taken to hospital in Coventry, where she died ten days later of a brain haemorrhage. She is buried in the churchyard of St John the Baptist, in Carno, Wales.

Legacy
Two months after her death in 1985, Laura Ashley Holdings went public in a flotation that was 34 times oversubscribed. A memorial plaque to Laura Ashley, at the family's former home 83 Cambridge Street, Pimlico was unveiled on 5 July 1994.

Sir Bernard Ashley died of cancer on 14 February 2009.

Foundation
The Laura Ashley Foundation was set up in 1987; as the Foundation has been run by the late Sir Bernard and their children, the strategy has evolved from purely funding the arts to also funding broader community and social welfare projects. It was this evolution that prompted the change of name in 2011 from The Laura Ashley Foundation to The Ashley Family Foundation.

References

External links
Laura Ashley company
in the FMD Ashley's entry in the Fashion Model Directory
National gallery portraits

1925 births
1985 deaths
Accidental deaths from falls
Accidental deaths in England
People from Dowlais
British textile designers
British fashion designers
20th-century Welsh businesspeople
Welsh fashion designers
British women company founders
Burials in Wales
Welsh women in business
20th-century British businesswomen
British women fashion designers